Mark William Kramer is an American journalist, author, professor, and editor.

Career

Mark Kramer is the author of four books of narrative journalism, and has written for National Geographic, The New York Times Magazine, and The Atlantic monthly. He is the co-editor of two textbooks in the field of narrative journalism. He was the founding director of the Nieman program on narrative Journalism at the Nieman Foundation for Journalism at Harvard University, and the power of narrative conference (1998–2008). He has been writer in residence at Smith College (1980–1990) and Boston University (1990–2001).

Publications

Travels With a Hungry Bear: a Journey to the Russian Heartland Houghton Mifflin, 1996 
Mother Walter and the Pig Tragedy Knopf, 1972 
Three Farms: Making Milk, Meat, and Money from the American Soil Atlantic/Little Brown, 1980; Bantam, 1981; Harvard University Press, 1987 
Invasive Procedures: A Year in the World of Two Surgeons. Harper & Row, 1982; Penguin, 1983 
Literary Journalism. Ballantine, 1995 
Telling True Stories: A Nonfiction Writer's Guide from the Nieman Foundation at Harvard University. Plume/Penguin, 2007

References

Year of birth missing (living people)
American writers

Living people